The 2023 Categoría Primera B season (officially known as the 2023 Torneo BetPlay Dimayor season for sponsorship reasons) is the 34th season of the Categoría Primera B since its founding as Colombia's second division football league. The season began on 2 February and is scheduled to end on 9 December 2023.

Format
The format for the 2023 Primera B season was approved at DIMAYOR's General Assembly session of 14 December 2022 and confirmed on 12 January 2023, keeping the system used in the previous season.

Two tournaments (Torneo I and Torneo II) with three stages each will be played. In the first stage of both tournaments, the 16 teams will play a single round-robin tournament with an additional matchday for regional derbies and home-and-away order reversed for the Torneo II. The top eight teams at the end of the sixteen rounds will advance to the semi-final stage, in which teams will be drawn into two groups of four where they will play each one of their rivals twice. The top team of each group will advance to the finals, playing a double-legged series with the winners advancing to the season's Grand Final.

The Grand Final to decide the season champions as well as the first promotion to Primera A, will be a double-legged series contested at the end of the season by the winners of the season's two tournaments. If one team wins both of the season's tournaments, the Grand Final will not be played and that team will be automatically crowned Primera B champions and promoted to the top flight. The second promotion spot to Primera A for the 2024 season will be decided in a promotion play-off between the Grand Final loser and the best-placed team of the season's aggregate table, other than the Grand Final winners.

Teams
16 teams take part in the season. The previous season's champions Boyacá Chicó and the winners of the promotion play-off series Atlético Huila were promoted to Primera A for the 2023 season and will be replaced in Primera B by Patriotas and Cortuluá, who were relegated from Primera A at the end of the 2022 season after finishing in the bottom two places of the top tier's relegation table.

On 14 December 2022 the General Assembly of DIMAYOR approved a proposal by Cortuluá to move their home matches from Tuluá to Yumbo, Valle del Cauca Department, starting from this season.

Torneo I

First stage

Standings

Results

Top scorers

{| class="wikitable" border="1"
|-
! Rank
! Player
! Club
! Goals
|-
| rowspan=2 align=center | 1
| Jhonier Blanco
|Fortaleza
| rowspan=2 align=center | 5
|-
| Jairo Ditta
|Cortuluá
|-
| rowspan=3 align=center | 3
| Jonathan Agudelo
|Cúcuta Deportivo
| rowspan=3 align=center | 4
|-
| Santiago Gómez
|Real Cartagena
|-
| Iván Rivas
|Patriotas
|-
| rowspan=5 align=center | 6
| Santiago Córdoba
|Patriotas
| rowspan=5 align=center | 3
|-
| Jan Franc Lucumí
|Boca Juniors
|-
| Johar Mejía
|Cortuluá
|-
| Darwin Palomeque
|Real Cartagena
|-
| Mateo Zuleta
|Leones
|}

Source: Soccerway

See also
 2023 Categoría Primera A season
 2023 Copa Colombia

References

External links 
  

Categoría Primera B seasons
2
Colombia
Colombia